Higo Seara Santos de Oliveira, commonly known simply as Higo (born 1 May 1986) is a Brazilian football midfielder.

He usually plays as left-winger.

In 2003, he signed with A.C. ChievoVerona and he debuted in the Serie A being only 17. In the following seasons he was member of Calcio Catania in the Serie B and A.C. Bellaria Igea Marina and A.S.G. Nocerina in the Serie C2. In the winter break of the 2006-07 season he moved to the neighbouring Slovenia playing half season with FC Koper playing in the First League.

External sources
 
 Stats from Slovenia at PrvaLiga 
 

1986 births
Living people
Brazilian footballers
Brazilian expatriate footballers
Association football wingers
A.C. ChievoVerona players
Serie A players
Catania S.S.D. players
A.C. Bellaria Igea Marina players
A.S.G. Nocerina players
Expatriate footballers in Italy
Slovenian PrvaLiga players
FC Koper players
Brazilian expatriate sportspeople in Slovenia
Expatriate footballers in Slovenia